The 2009 UK Music Video Awards were held on 13 October 2009 at the Odeon West End in Leicester Square, London to recognise the best in music videos and music film making from United Kingdom and worldwide. The nominations were announced on 28 September 2009. British rock band Coldplay won Video of the Year for "Strawberry Swing", directed by Shynola.

Video of the Year

Special Awards

Video Genre Categories

Craft and Technical Categories

Individual and Company Categories

References

External links
Official website

UK Music Video Awards
UK Music Video Awards
UK Music Video Awards